WJXE-LD, virtual channel 10 (VHF digital channel 25), is a low-powered Rewind TV television station serving Jacksonville, Florida, United States. that is licensed to Gainesville. The station is owned by the DTV America subsidiary of HC2 Holdings.

History 
The station’s construction permit was initially issued on January 30, 2012 under the calls of W25EO-D. It was changed to WFEO-LD on March 11, 2013, and finally WJXE-LD July 2, 2019 on February 2, 2017.

On December 31, 2022, Azteca America ceased operations.

Digital channels
The station's digital signal is multiplexed:

References

External links
DTV America

Low-power television stations in the United States
Innovate Corp.
FFC-LD
Television channels and stations established in 2011
2012 establishments in Michigan